Saliba is an Oceanic language spoken on the islets off the southeastern tip of Papua New Guinea. There are approximately 2,500 speakers of Saliba. Significant documentation of the language was undertaken by the Saliba-Logea documentation project, and hundreds of audio-video resources can be found in the project archive.

Culture
The most common occupation for the Saliba people is fishing. The four major villages are Sidudu, Sawasawaga, Logeakai and Logeapwata.

Endangerment
The Saliba language is currently endangered. Currently there are only elders that speak it and a few young children who have learned in the early years of their life. Most of the people speak English because it is seen as the more prestigious language. This only further makes Saliba the minority language in the land.

Phonology

Consonant 

Vowels

Listed above are the consonants for Saliba in IPA (International Phonetic Alphabet).

Orthography
In its orthography, Saliba uses Latin alphabets. The letters can also be upper case or lower case. All of Saliba's orthography is in the table below.

Syllables
The syllables in Saliba have three possible structures. They are V, CV, or CVN (CVN being a heavy syllable).  All syllables in Saliba are enunciated the same. There is occasionally a slight stress on the syllable just before the last syllable. For example, in the word , meaning 'hear', the syllable in the middle would be slightly stressed. In Saliba, all nouns, verbs, adjectives, and some adverbs are composed of at least two light syllables or one heavy syllable. On the other hand, words used mostly for grammatical functions, such as conjunctions, pronouns, particles, etc. can be made up of only a CV or just a V.

Grammar

Verbs
All verbs in Saliba can be classified as either transitive or intransitive verbs on formal grounds. To convert from transitive to intransitive verbs the suffix  or a suffix that looks like  is used, C being any consonant depending on the verb. The suffix  can also be used to turn some nouns into transitive verbs. For example, 'knife', becomes , 'cut with a knife'. Another important formational affix for verbs is the causative prefix , e.g. , 'see' becomes , 'show', or, 'cause to see'. Something special about the verbs in Saliba is that the stems of two lexical verbs can combine to form one inflected verb. The two stems have combined to form one complex verb.

Tense and aspect
Tense is not marked in Saliba verb phrases, but aspect is. When absolute time reference is needed, Saliba uses time words like , 'yesterday', 'tomorrow', or oblique phrases like , 'in the morning'.

Reduplication
Saliba uses reduplication for a few things. One function of reduplication is to convert certain action verbs into noun. For example, the word  means 'to sweep'. If  is reduplicated to  it becomes 'broom'. Another example could be  meaning 'go'. If that word is reduplicated to  it now means 'method' or 'way'. Another reason a verb would be reduplicated is the verb is being used as an attributive verb. An example of this would be in the sentence . That sentence means 'good food'. Notice , meaning 'good', is reduplicated since it is a verb that is being used like an adjective. The last reason a verb would get reduplicated is in the imperfective aspect of an action verb. The reduplication is used to mark this occurrence in the sentence. Imperfective aspect is used to show habitual or progressive events. For example, in the sentence  which means '(they) did not work in the garden'. The  ('work') is reduplicated to mark that this is probably a habitual behavior.

Adjectives
As far as adjectives go, in Saliba there appears to be no difference between verbs and adjectives. The only rule is, with the exception of some verbs, all verbs are duplicated when they are going to be used as adjectives.

Nouns
Nouns in Saliba have four kinds of affixes that can be attached to them. The first one is a suffix that is used for possession. The next one is the plural suffix which is (or ) on nouns that refer to humans. Another affix is the locative suffix. The last affix is called a determiner.

Noun phrases
Noun phrases are everything in a sentence that is not the verb. Noun phrases can be subjects, objects, predicates and parts of prepositional and post-positional phrases. In its simplest form, a noun phrase can be made out of just a noun and a determiner. For example, which in Saliba means 'eel', is a simple noun phrase. A noun phrase is typically broken up into two parts, the nucleus and possibly multiple modifiers. Modifiers can include things like possessors and demonstratives (words that give location), which would go before the head noun. The other types of modifiers, such as verbal modifiers and quantifiers, would go after the head noun.

One of the most important modifiers is the determiner. This modifier is usually attached to the last part of the noun phrase and gives a reference to the head noun in the noun phrase with regard to the rest of the sentence. However, noun phrases used as prepositional phrases do not have determiners.

Quantifiers such as cardinal numerals can go either before or after the adjective in a sentence. Ordinal numerals on the other hand, such as first, second, etc. behave like adjectives and go after the noun in Saliba.

Pronouns

The table holds all the different pronouns in Saliba. There are different rules for using each of them though. Starting with independent pronouns, when using these pronouns in a sentence they can and will most likely form noun phrases and will have a determiner. An example of a sentence using an independent pronoun could go as follows: , which means 'We were scared'. In the next column are subject pronouns, these pronouns are used as the subject in a sentence hence their name. To be more precise one could say they are the subject of verbal clauses. According to linguists who have studied Saliba, object pronouns are only put on certain objects. One example using both types of pronouns could be , which means 'Wake up the children'. Note the  particle marking the subject and the  particle marking possession. Another example could be , meaning 'My mother and my father woke us up'. In the last column, possessions, the rules for using the suffixes in a sentence are split up into alienable possessions and inalienable possessions. For alienable possessions, the possessive pronoun goes after one of the two possessive classifiers as shown in the table below.  

Instead, the possessive pronoun suffix goes after the possessed noun. If the inalienable noun is plural then the plural suffix will just go directly after the possessive suffix, as shown in the table below.

Demonstratives
A demonstrative is a type of pronoun that points out a noun. Saliba's demonstrative pronouns are as follows:

Interrogative and indefinite pronouns
In Saliba most of the interrogative pronouns also function as indefinite pronouns. Interrogative pronouns are pronouns used when asking a question. Indefinite pronouns are pronouns used to mention any sort of general person, place, or thing. The interrogative/indefinite pronouns for Saliba are listed below. 

All of the pronouns in this list except the last two are nouns. The last two happen to be verbs. An example of using one of these in a sentence would be  meaning 'where did you go?'.

Possession
As mentioned previously, Saliba has different rules for possessions depending on if they are alienable possessions or inalienable possessions. In a sentence the person who possesses the possessed noun is treated as the subject and possessed noun is then the head of the predicate. They are written in such a way that there is nothing separating the subject from the head of the predicate. To negate the predicate, such as saying someone does not have something, the negation particle  would be added before the predicate phrase like so: , meaning 'I don't have a child'. The following table lists things the people of Saliba find inalienable, alienable  constructions, and alienable  constructions. 

Depending on the context, almost any noun can appear as alienable or inalienable.

The category of body parts refers to things like hands, feet, etc. Parts of inanimate objects includes things such as the root of a coconut or the core of an apple. Spatial relation refers to space, such as the inside of a house. Container and content can mean things like a cup of water or a bowl of food. Quantity and quantified items are not referring to objects, but are rather more figurative, referring to age and time.

In terms of semantics, linguists can see three different types of relationships based on these constructions. Those relationships are relationships where the possessor and the possessee can part, relationships in which the possessor and the possessee cannot part but the possessor has complete control over the possessee, and a relationship in which the possessor and the possessee cannot part but the possessee has an effect on the possessor. An example of the last relationship would be a body part. Kinship is an outlier and appears in all three categories. Linguists do not know why this is. They can only assume that it is because of historical reasons. Some examples of inalienable kinships and alienable kinships are listed in the following table.

Numeral

Basic sentence structure
Saliba is a subject-object-verb (SOV) language. Saliba follows the nominative-accusative pattern in its sentences. The basic clause in Saliba is composed of a verb with its subject and object with its affixes. Any noun phrases preceding or succeeding this core can be thought of as an expansion of this clause. A simple sentence could be , which means 'We were really frightened'. Saliba also has nonverbal clauses such as nominal clauses, existential clauses, possessive clauses and clauses with other special predicates.

An example of a nominal clause would be , which means 'we are teachers'. The next nonverbal clause is the existential clause. These types of clauses will have the word  ('there') or a post-positional phrase to refer to a location. An example of this would be in the sentence , which means 'There are two schools'. Another nonverbal clause would be the possessive clause, which is a noun phrase that refers to a possessor and a possessee.

Conjunctions
The following table lists all the conjunctions in Saliba and their usage.

Determiners
In Saliba, determiners are always the last part of a noun phrase. Most nouns will have a determiner after them. If a noun phrase is a predicate, then it will not have a determiner.

Particles
Saliba uses many different particles to mark certain things in sentences. These particles usually go before the verb phrase but there are a couple that can go after the verb phrase.

The particle  is used to mark that something new is happening. This could mean a change in the situation, a change in the weather etc. An example sentence would be . This sentence means 'When we were sleeping, it started to rain'. Notice  is used because something changed, in this case the weather. Another instance in which  can be used is to indicate an event that will happen in the future. For example, if someone said, "", (meaning 'What are we going to do?'),  is used to imply a change to the current situation. In all of these sentences the particle is actually placed in many different places in the sentence. For example, in the first sentence the particle was placed before the object, while in the second sentence it was placed before the subject. The placement of this particle varies and there do not appear to be any specific rules as to where to exactly put  in a sentence. All that is known is that it can sometimes go at the very beginning of a sentence before everything else, just before the subject, or after the subject but before the predicate.

This particle is used to mark something that should happen or something that someone should do. The closest English word to this particle would be the word must; however, it is not as strong as must. For example, in the sentence , which means 'You must go to the market', the particle can be directly translated as 'must'. However, in the following sentence , meaning 'I want to steal the pastor's rooster', the use of  here is not as strong as something that has to be done, and is closer to 'want' in this case.

is a negation particle. This particle is used when the speaker wants to express something that should not happen or should not be done. For example, in the sentence  the speaker is saying 'don't worry'. Note that in the previous sentence, since the subject is third person, the particle  must be used with the particle  like shown.

is another negation particle. This particle is used to express something that a person does not want to do. An example sentence could be , which means 'I don't want to tell'.

is a particle that is used to express something that has to be done no matter what.

Linguists cannot classify this particle. They have best described it as an inalienably possessed noun. This particle is used for something that someone is able to do. A simple example would be , meaning 'Can you speak Saliba?'.

The particle  is used when the speaker is presuming something to be true. For example, the sentence , which means 'Perhaps my mother went to the market yesterday'. As seen in this sentence,  is used to express the fact that the speaker does not know for sure if his mother went to the market – it is a guess or assumption.

These two particles, unlike the ones previously, go after the verb phrase instead of before the verb phrase. Both of these particles are used to express something that has already been done previously before the time at which the speaker is talking about it. An example sentence using  would be , which means 'That young man had already married the girl'. An example sentence using  would be , meaning 'My house burnt down'. As shown in both sentences, since these particles go after the verb phrase they are the last things in the sentence.

This particle, like  and  goes after the verb phrase in the sentence. Clearly this particle is derived from the word  meaning 'one'.  is used to mark things that happen continuously and without interruption – for example, which means 'It kept on raining'.

References

Nuclear Papuan Tip languages
Languages of Milne Bay Province